Pevtsov (from певец meaning singer) is a Russian masculine surname, its feminine counterpart is Pevtsova. It may refer to
Dmitry Pevtsov (born 1963), Russian actor and singer
Rostyslav Pevtsov (born 1987), Azerbaijani triathlete

Russian-language surnames